Calver is a village in Derbyshire, England.

Calver may also refer to:

Calver (surname)
Calver Hill, a fell in the Yorkshire Dales National Park in North Yorkshire, England
Calver Island, an archaeological site in Swatara Township, Dauphin County, Pennsylvania
CalVer, a type of date-based versioning for software.